John Ayshford Wise (1810 – 9 September 1865) was a British Liberal and Whig politician.

Wise was first elected Whig MP for Stafford at the 1852 general election and, becoming a Liberal in 1859, held the seat until 1860, when he resigned by becoming Steward of the Manor of Hempholme, causing a by-election.

References

External links
 

Whig (British political party) MPs for English constituencies
Liberal Party (UK) MPs for English constituencies
UK MPs 1852–1857
UK MPs 1857–1859
UK MPs 1859–1865
1810 births
1865 deaths
Members of the Parliament of the United Kingdom for Stafford